Dalla austini is a species of butterfly in the family Hesperiidae. It is found in Chiapas, Mexico.

References

Butterflies described in 2011
austini